Antara Mitra  (born 10 July 1987) is an Indian playback singer. Mitra came to limelight when she became a contestant in the popular singing reality show Indian Idol 2 in 2006. Mitra become more well-known and got recognition after the release of her duets Gerua and Janam Janam with Arijit Singh. She also received significant amount of Indian media coverage for her singing of the Dilwale songs. Her Baby Jaan song from Bhaijaan Elo Re received an overwhelming response on YouTube, and created a record of becoming the fastest Bengali language video track to reach 1 million views on YouTube .

Early life and struggles

Mitra is from Maslandapur, a small town in West Bengal, near Calcutta, India. 
Mitra grew up with music all around her: her father is a music teacher. Since the age of three, Mitra would sing along with other children who came to her home to learn from her father. Mitra started doing stage singing performances since the age of 6. Mitra was more inclined towards the singing of her aunt. Her aunt used to sing for All India Radio. She sung Bengali Folk songs during her growing up days.
She exhibited a keen early interest in music, and her father supported her. She was accepted as a contestant at age 18 on a national TV show and competed admirably as a finalist in both that show and a successive similar show Junoon.
At one time she considered studying medicine, but abandoned the idea in favour of pursuing a professional singing career.

Mitra participated in the Indian Idol season 2. Though she reached the top five but got eliminated.
When Mitra was eliminated from the contest, well-known music director Anu Malik offered her playback singing work, but Mitra returned to her home town and soon afterward (April 2006) she relocated to Mumbai to pursue a vocal-performance-for-film soundtrack career.
She then participated as part of the Bollywood team of vocalist contestants in another popular Indian TV reality show, Junoon – Kuchh Kar Dikhaane Ka, where again she was not the winner, however she considers both shows learning and career-development experiences, and expressed gratitude to the TV audience, producers and judges of both contests for allowing her opportunities to perform for the broadcast audience and judges while competing.

During her early days in a city like Mumbai, she managed to survive by consuming instant-noodles like Maggi and burger as they were cheap.
Mitra got widespread recognition as a singer after her duets songs Gerua and Janam Janam became hits in the year 2015, which was almost 9 years after she moved to Mumbai.

Music career
Mitra sings in multiple languages: Hindi, Urdu, Bengali, and English and is active in the Bollywood film soundtrack music industry.

In an interview to the Times of India in 2010, Mitra thanked and expressed her gratitude to Music Director Pritam, as he was the first one to show faith in her talent, as at that time all film songs for which she had lend her vocals were composed by Pritam.
Mitra received positive reviews for her first hit song "Bheegi Bhaagi Si" a duet with Mohit Chauhan from Hindi film Rajneeti.

Mitra got widespread recognition for her acclaimed duet songs Gerua, Janam Janam co-sung with Arijit Singh.

Indian Idol 2 performances

Audition
"Dama Dam Mast Kalandar" (Runa Laila)
The judges liked it, however Anu Malik was a bit hesitant.

Theater round
"Kaisi Paheli Hai" (Parineeta)
Mitra was through to the piano round!

Piano round
"Hume To Loot Liya Milke Husn Waalon Ne" (Private album) – Most votes
Mitra received good comments, especially from Anu, "I think I have found my playback singer," and made it through to the finals with the most votes.

Recordings and appearances
 Woh Pehli Baar album – sang a group number and solo "Tu Rutha To".
 TV appearances have included specials (and soap operas) including Navarati, Thodi Khushi Thode Gham, Music Masti Dhoom, Kyunki, Kis Desh Mein Hai Meraa Dil, Kitani Mohabbat Hai, K for Kishore and auditioning contestants in Bhopal for Indian Idol 3.
 Was a contestant on Adnan's Bol Baby Bol show (won 200,000 for reciting famous song lyrics).
 Joined Nauman and Salman in Koi Aane Ko Hai, another Ekta Kapoor soap opera (broadcast on Colors).
 Was a semi-finalist (as a member of the Bollywood contingent) on Junoon – Kuchh Kar Dikhaane Ka singing contest (reality show on NDTV Imagine).
 Was a contestant who reached the final four in IPL Rockstar contest (reality show on Colors).
 Recorded songs in Bengali (Doshomi), Haryanvi (Tera Mera Vaada), etc.
 Sung a song ek duje ke which is used in the famous serial yeh rishta Kya kehlata hai.

Discography

Film songs

Awards

References

External links

1987 births
Living people
Indian women playback singers
Indian Idol participants
Bollywood playback singers
Singers from Kolkata
21st-century Indian singers
21st-century Indian women singers
Women musicians from West Bengal